The Cooper Do-nuts Riot was a small uprising in response to police harassment of LGBT people at the 24-hour Cooper Do-nuts cafe in Los Angeles in May 1959. This occurred 10 years prior to the better-known Stonewall riots in New York City and is viewed by some historians as the first modern LGBT uprising in the United States.

Background 

Few people lived openly as LGBT in the 1950s, and faced both social and legal consequences if they did. One of the few places they were welcome were gay bars, which themselves often faced legal consequences for serving them, such as the loss of their license. Los Angeles law made it illegal for a person's gender presentation not to match the gender shown on their ID, and this was often used to target and arrest transgender or cross-dressing bar patrons. For this reason, many gay bars were hostile to transgender patrons and banned or discouraged them from entering. 

Novelist John Rechy, who was present at the riot, described the routine arrests in his 1963 novel, City of Night: "They interrogate you, fingerprint you without booking you: an illegal L.A. cop-tactic to scare you from hanging around." The names of individuals arrested in a bar raid would routinely be reported by local newspapers, outing them to the community, usually resulting in the loss of jobs and being socially ostracized. Arrests by the Los Angeles Police Department for homosexuality had increased by more than 85% in the previous decade under the police chief William H. Parker. Queer activist Harry Hay later recalled that abuse of LGBT people by police was common during this time, and sometimes met resistance.

Riots 
Cooper Do-nuts was a café on Main Street in downtown Los Angeles' Skid Row neighborhood. Located between two gay bars – Harold's and The Waldorf – and open all night, it was a popular hangout for gay people, and welcomed them. One evening in May 1959, two police officers entered the cafe and asked for IDs from several patrons, a typical form of harassment. The officers attempted to arrest two drag queens, two male sex workers, and a young man cruising for a date. One person they attempted to arrest was Rechy, who describes the LAPD's abuse on this night as a culmination of routine targeting of the LGBTQ community.

One of those arrested protested the lack of room in the police car for all five of them, and onlookers began throwing assorted coffee, donuts, cups, and trash at the police until they fled in their car without making the arrests. People then took to rioting and celebrating in the streets, as a larger crowd grew as patrons of surrounding gay bars and others in the area heard about it. Police backup arrived, blocking off the street for the entire night; they beat or arrested several people. Rechy was still slated for arrest, but escaped.

Legacy 
The Cooper Do-nuts uprising is often cited as the first gay uprising in the United States. Hay identified it as the first specifically against police treatment of LGBT people. Some historians contest the significance, claiming that anyone who was openly gay at the time was already in rebellion and risking arrest and imprisonment. Mark Thompson, a historian who lived in the same area as Rechy, wrote: "I would not describe it as a riot but more like an isolated patch of local social unrest that had lasting repercussions. I think less in its day, more as a lesson for us today."

In 2020 the Downtown Los Angeles Neighborhood Council considered making Cooper Do-nuts a historical site and requested police records to corroborate Rechy's account of the riots. The Los Angeles Police Department revealed that there were no records from that time, because they were either "purged or destroyed". Despite not being a first person account, Nancy Valverde claims she had heard about it from a lesbian friend and that she had heard about it right away.

See also 

List of LGBT actions in the United States prior to the Stonewall riots
Compton's Cafeteria riot (1966)
Black Cat Tavern riot (1967)
Stonewall riots (1969)

Further reading 
10 Years Before Stonewall, There Was the Cooper's Donuts Riot
Mapping Los Angeles's groundbreaking role in LGBT history

References

1950s in LGBT history
1959 in Los Angeles
1959 riots
History of LGBT civil rights in the United States
History of Los Angeles
LGBT civil rights demonstrations
LGBT-related riots
May 1959 events in the United States
Police brutality in the United States